Druzhne is a village in Khmilnyk Raion (district) in Vinnytsia Oblast of west-central Ukraine.

Demographics
Native language as of the Ukrainian Census of 2001:
 Ukrainian 98.73%
 Russian 1.27%

Footnotes

References

Villages in Khmilnyk Raion